Harsha Vardhan is an Indian actor, comedian and screenwriter known for his works predominantly in Telugu cinema. He has also worked in a few Tamil and Hindi language films, in addition to television.

He is known for his performance in Telugu TV serials such as Ruthu Raagalu and Amrutham and has appeared in more than thirty films in a variety of roles. He turned into script and dialogue writer with the films such as Gunde Jaari Gallanthayyinde and Manam. He received Santosham Best Dialogue Award for Manam at 13th Santosham Film Awards.

Filmography

Films

 All films are in Telugu unless otherwise noted.

Television

References

External links
 
 

Telugu comedians
1974 births
Living people
People from Srikakulam district
Indian male comedians
Male actors in Telugu cinema
Indian male film actors
Male actors in Hindi cinema
Male actors in Tamil cinema
Male actors in Malayalam cinema
21st-century Indian male actors
People from Uttarandhra
Santosham Film Awards winners
Male actors from Andhra Pradesh
Male actors in Telugu television
Telugu male actors
Indian comedians